Stjepan Filipović (27 January 1916 – 22 May 1942) was a Yugoslav communist who led the Kolubara Company of the Valjevo Partisan Detachment during the 1941 Partisan uprising. He was captured and executed in 1942 in Valjevo. A photo of him taken shortly before his execution became a symbol of resistance against fascism in the Second World War, and was, among others, exhibited in the United Nations building in New York. He was proclaimed People's Hero of Yugoslavia in 1949.

Biography

Stjepan Filipović was born on 27 January 1916 in Opuzen (modern-day Croatia) as the fifth child of Anton and Ivka Filipović. He was an ethnic Croat. The Filipović family moved throughout the Kingdom of Yugoslavia, so he lived in Županja, Mostar and Kragujevac. In Kragujevac, he studied locksmithing and mastered the basics of electrical wiring, carpentry and bookbinding. He joined the labour movement in 1937, but he was arrested in 1939 and sentenced to a year in prison. He joined the Communist Party of Yugoslavia in 1940.

Filipović was commander of the Partisans' Tamnavsko-Kolubarski unit in Valjevo (modern-day Serbia) by 1941. He was captured on 24 December 1941 by Chetniks unit of Kosta Pećanac and hanged in Valjevo by a Serbian State Guard unit on 27 May 1942, aged 26. As the rope was put around his neck, Filipović raised his arms and shouted "Smrt fašizmu, sloboda narodu!" ("Death to fascism, freedom to the people!"). He urged the Yugoslav people to resist and implored them to never cease resisting. A photograph taken at this moment was widely reproduced and became a symbol of anti-fascist resistance. A statue of Filipović was cast in its likeness.

Filipović was declared a National Hero of Yugoslavia on 14 December 1949. The town of Valjevo has a statue dedicated to him, "Stevan Filipović". A monument was also erected in his home town of Opuzen in 1968, but was demolished in 1991.

His brother Šimun was shot by Germans in the Kragujevac massacre in Serbia; although he was an ethnic Croat, which could have saved him from death, he refused to say so, sharing his fate with citizens of Kragujevac. Stjepan's second brother Nikola was killed in May 1943 as a member of the 1st Proletarian Brigade.

References

External links

Narodni heroji Jugoslavije, Mladost, Belgrade, 1975.

1916 births
1942 deaths
People from Opuzen
People from the Kingdom of Dalmatia
Yugoslav Partisans members
20th-century Croatian people
Croatian communists
Executed Croatian people
Recipients of the Order of the People's Hero
Resistance members killed by Nazi Germany
People executed by Nazi Germany by hanging
Croatian people executed by Nazi Germany
Yugoslav people executed by Nazi Germany
People notable for being the subject of a specific photograph